Brian Lewis may refer to:

Brian Lewis, 2nd Baron Essendon (1903–1978), British motor-racing driver
Brian Lewis (architect) (1906–1991), professor of architecture at the University of Melbourne
Brian Lewis (illustrator) (1929–1978), British science fiction illustrator and comics artist
Brian Lewis (politician) (born 1936), Canadian politician in the Northwest Territories government
Brian Lewis (footballer) (1943–1998), English footballer
Brian Lewis (cricketer) (born 1945), Welsh cricketer
Brian Lewis (PR executive) (born 1945), former vice-president of Fox News
Brian Lewis (sailor) (born 1942), Australian Olympic sailor
Brian Lewis (sprinter) (born 1974), American Olympic athlete
Brian J. Lewis (born 1929), American politician

See also
Bryan Lewis (born 1942), Canadian municipal politician and former NHL referee
Bryan Lewis, American Trump aide